Drochia is a city in the northern part of Moldova. It is the administrative center of the eponymous district. The average elevation of Drochia is 226 meters. The population at the 2004 census was 16,606.

The name of the city comes from a local type of bird, called dropie (English: great bustard).

History 
Drochia is first mentioned by chroniclers in 1777. By 1830 it was a small settlement encompassing 25 families. A document dating from 1847 notes that a small grape-processing plant, the town's first industrial enterprise, had been built. Two mills situated on a local stream were built in 1875.

More intensive industrial development emerged after the railway first came through at the end of the 19th century. At the 1930 census, the locality (then a village) was known as Drochia-Gară (literally Drochia Station), and had a population of only 595. It was part of Plasa Bădiceni of the Soroca County.

Drochia received the status of a city in 1973.

Demographics

Media
 Radio Chişinău 93.8 FM
 Vocea Basarabiei 101,0
 Radio Studentus www.studentus.md/listen.html

Mayors of Drochia
 Anatol Pleşca 1991–1999
 Valeriu Ceban 1999–2007
 Grigore Melnic 2007 – 2011
 Igor Grozavu 2011 – 2015
 Nina Cereteu 2015 -

Photo gallery

International relations

Twin towns – Sister cities
Drochia is twinned with:
 Borisov, Belarus
 Dorohoi, Romania
 Kolomyia, Ukraine
 Rădăuți, Romania
 Pineto, Italy

References

External links
 Drochia Stadium on divizianationala.com
 Weather in Drochia
 Bogdan Petriceicu Hasdeu High School Webpage 
 Drochia in Photos
 Meteo Moldova
 Drochia.md

 
Drochia District
Cities and towns in Moldova
Moldova articles needing attention